Ali Saberi (born 1973) is an Iranian lawyer and disability rights activist who serves as a member of City Council of Tehran since 2014. Saberi who is considered one of the highest-paid lawyers in Iran, has been fully blind since he was born. He is affiliated with the reformist bloc.

References

1973 births
Living people
University of Tehran alumni
Iranian disability rights activists
Blind politicians
Iranian reformists
20th-century Iranian lawyers
Iranian blind people
21st-century Iranian lawyers
Blind lawyers
Tehran Councillors 2013–2017
Iranian politicians with disabilities